Herpetogramma ochrimaculalis is a moth in the family Crambidae. It was described by South in 1901. It is found in China, Japan and Taiwan.

References

Moths described in 1901
Herpetogramma
Moths of Asia